Serria Tawan (born September 4, 1978) is an African-American model, actress, and published author.

Career
She was chosen as Playboy's Playmate of the Month in November, 2002 and has appeared in numerous Playboy videos. She guest-starred on a special Playmates vs. Bachelors edition of Family Feud.

Author
She has published a book with two other playmates titled The Bunny Book: How To Walk, Talk, Tease, and Please Like a Playboy Bunny.

References

External links
 

1978 births
Living people
2000s Playboy Playmates
African-American Playboy Playmates
African-American female models
African-American actresses
Actresses from Chicago
American film actresses
American television actresses
21st-century African-American people
21st-century African-American women
20th-century African-American people
20th-century African-American women